Mangyt is a village in the Aravan District, Osh Region of Kyrgyzstan. Its population was 2,837 in 2021.

References

Populated places in Osh Region